Kimberly du Buclet is a former Democratic member of the Illinois House of Representatives. She represented the 26th District from 2011 to 2013. She was appointed to her seat in May 2011 after former incumbent William D. Burns stepped down as District 26 representative to become Chicago's 4th Ward alderman, and did not run for a full term in the 2012 election. In 2020, du Buclet is a Democratic nominee for a two-year term to the board of the Metropolitan Water Reclamation District of Greater Chicago, after winning the primary election on March 17, 2020.

During her House tenure, du Buclet's committee assignments included Health Care Availability Access, Small Business Empowerment & Workforce, Higher Education, Appropriations-Human Services, Health & Healthcare Disparities, and Tourism & Conventions.

Early life and education
De Buclet attended high school at University of Chicago Laboratory Schools. She also received a Bachelor of Science in marketing from the University of Illinois at Urbana–Champaign and an Master of Business Administration in marketing from the University of Chicago Booth School of Business.

References

Year of birth missing (living people)
Living people
Women state legislators in Illinois
Members of the Illinois House of Representatives
Politicians from Chicago
Gies College of Business alumni
University of Chicago Booth School of Business alumni
University of Chicago Laboratory Schools alumni
21st-century American women